Paule Baudouin (born 25 October 1984) is a French handball player, playing for the French club Fleury Loiret HB and for the French national team. She was born in Saint Denis.

She made her debut on the French national team in 2004. She competed at the 2006 European Championship in Sweden, where the French team placed third and at the 2008 Summer Olympics in Beijing, where the French team finished fifth, and at the 2012 Summer Olympics in London where the team finished fifth again.

References

French female handball players
Handball players at the 2008 Summer Olympics
Handball players at the 2012 Summer Olympics
Olympic handball players of France
Expatriate handball players
1984 births
Living people
Sportspeople from Saint-Denis, Seine-Saint-Denis
French expatriate sportspeople in Denmark
French expatriate sportspeople in Germany
Mediterranean Games medalists in handball
Mediterranean Games gold medalists for France
Competitors at the 2009 Mediterranean Games